64 Arietis is a possible binary star system in the northern constellation of Aries. 64 Arietis is the Flamsteed designation. It is faintly visible to the naked eye as a dim, orange-hued star with an apparent visual magnitude of +5.67. It is receding from the Earth with a heliocentric radial velocity of +8.5 km/s.

The visible component is an aging giant star with a stellar classification of K4 III, currently on the red giant branch. It is around 5.2 billion years old with 1.27 times the mass of the Sun. With the supply of hydrogen at its core exhausted, the star has expanded to 11 times the radius of the Sun and it shines with 42 times the Sun's luminosity. This energy is being radiated from the outer envelope at an effective temperature of 4,426 K, giving it the orange-hued glow of a K-type star.

References

External links
Aladin previewer
Aladin sky atlas
 HR 1022

K-type giants
Astrometric binaries
Aries (constellation)
Durchmusterung objects
Arietis, 64
021017
015861
1022